Jorbat (also Romanized as Jarbat, Jorbod, Jūrbud, and Zhūbāt; also known as Zobāt) is a village in Chahardeh Sankhvast Rural District, Jolgeh Sankhvast District, Jajrom County, North Khorasan Province, Iran. At the 2006 census, its population was 639, in 185 families.

References 

Populated places in Jajrom County